Queen's Lane Coffee House is a historic coffee house established by Cirques Jobson, a Levantine Jew from Syria. Dating back to 1654, it claims to be the oldest continually serving coffee house in Europe although, it has only been on the present site, (Oxford, England) since 1970. The coffee house is where Jeremy Bentham first developed the concept of utilitarianism.

The coffee house is situated on the north side of the High Street (at No. 40), on the corner of Queen's Lane, hence the name "Queen's Lane Coffee House". Close by are The Queen's College to the west and St Edmund Hall to the north. It is popular with University of Oxford and Oxford Brookes University students and tourists alike.

In 2009, it rebranded itself as "QL". There is a second, smaller, QL Café and Delicatessen at 126 High Street under the same ownership. Another Café QL (now called Café Bonjour) in Headington was once owned by the same family but was sold years ago.

The café has been owned by the same family since 1983.

It serves a wide range of traditional British dishes such as fish and chips, pies, and the famous full English breakfast. It also offers Turkish and Mediterranean dishes including moussaka, kofte, salads, and vegetarian and Halal alternatives.

See also
 English coffeehouses in the 17th and 18th centuries

References

External links
 Queen's Lane Coffee House website
 Queen's Lane Coffee House information from Daily Information
 Queen's Lane Coffee House information from OxfordCityGuide.com
 Queen's Lane Coffee House information from The Oxford Guide

1654 establishments in England
Shops in Oxford
Coffeehouses and cafés in the United Kingdom